The Kilombero weaver (Ploceus burnieri) is a species of bird in the family Ploceidae.
It is endemic to Tanzania.

Its natural habitat is swamps.
It is threatened by habitat loss.

References

External links
 Kilombero weaver -  Species text in Weaver Watch.

Kilombero weaver
Endemic birds of Tanzania
Kilombero weaver
Taxonomy articles created by Polbot